The 2010 FIVB Volleyball Men's World Championship was held in Italy from 25 September to 10 October 2010. The tournament featured 24 teams to determine the world champions in men's volleyball. In addition to 2006 champion Brazil and host nation Italy, 22 teams qualified for the tournament by means of continental and regional competitions. The matches took place in ten venues across ten Italian cities, with the final being held at the PalaLottomatica, Rome.

The tournament was won by Brazil, who beat Cuba in final. Brazil won their third straight world championship having won previously in 2002 and 2006. The podium was completed by Serbia who defeated Italy in the 3rd place match. Brazilian wing-spiker Murilo Endres was named the tournament MVP.

Brazil's victory continued their eight-year period of domination of world volleyball. Brazil has now won 15 of 17 major competitions since 2002. Brazil's third straight world championship equals the record for consecutive titles set by Italy in the 1990s.

Host
Finals hosts Italy. The tournament was held in ten Italy cities.

Qualification

The regional qualification stage determined the 24 teams that would compete in the championship competition. Two spots were guaranteed to the host country Italy and 2006 champions Brazil. Regional governing bodies were allocated the remaining 22 spots. Africa was granted three, Asia and Oceania four, Europe eight, North America five and South America two places. Qualification competitions took place ranging from January to August 2009.

Pools composition

First round

Teams were seeded in the first two positions of each pool following the serpentine system according to their FIVB World Ranking as of 28 July 2009. FIVB reserved the right to seed the hosts as head of pool A regardless of the World Ranking. All teams not seeded were drawn to take other available positions in the remaining lines, following the World Ranking. The draw was held in Rome, Italy on 28 October 2009. Rankings are shown in brackets except the hosts who ranked 6th.

Second round

Third round

Squads

Venues

First round
All times are Central European Summer Time (UTC+02:00).
In the first round pool competitions, each pool played a round-robin schedule, with each team playing every other team. The top three teams advanced to the second round.

Pool A
Pool A featured host country Italy, as well as Egypt, Japan and Iran. Italy defeated all three teams, while the remaining teams each finished with a 1–2 record. Iran were eliminated by virtue of scoring the fewest points during the three-game schedule.

|}

|}

Pool B
Pool B featured reigning  champions Brazil, as well as Cuba, Spain and Tunisia. Cuba won all three of their matches. Tunisia were defeated in every match and eliminated from the competition. Brazil and Cuba would face each other again in the tournament final, where Brazil would repeat as world champions.

|}

|}

Pool C
Pool C featured Russia, Puerto Rico, Cameroon and Australia. Russia won all their matches, while Australia were eliminated after going 0–3.

|}

|}

Pool D
Pool D featured the United States, Argentina, Mexico and Venezuela. Venezuela were eliminated after not winning a single set.

|}

|}

Pool E
Pool E featured France, Czech Republic, Bulgaria and China. China were eliminated after not winning a match.

|}

|}

Pool F
Pool F featured Poland, who won the silver medal in the last edition. The pool also featured Serbia, Germany and Canada.

|}

|}

Second round
All times are Central European Summer Time (UTC+02:00).
In the second round, participants were divided into six pools of three teams, pools G–N, with each pool again playing a round-robin. The bottom team were eliminated from the competition, while the top two advanced to the third round.

Pool G
Pool G featured host Italy, as well as Germany and Puerto Rico. Puerto Rico were eliminated after losing both matches.

|}

|}

Pool H
Pool H featured Serbia, Cuba and Mexico. Mexico were eliminated after being defeated in both matches.

|}

|}

Pool I
Pool I featured Spain, Russia and Egypt. Egypt were eliminated after not winning a match.

|}

|}

Pool L
Pool L featured the Czech Republic, United States and Cameroon. Cameroon did not win a match and were eliminated from the competition.

|}

|}

Pool M
Pool M featured Argentina, France and Japan. Japan did not win a match and were eliminated.

|}

|}

Pool N
Pool N featured Bulgaria, Brazil and Poland. Bulgaria swept eventual champion Brazil in three sets. Poland did not win a match and were eliminated.

|}

|}

Third round
All times are Central European Summer Time (UTC+02:00).
In the third round, the twelve remaining teams were divided into four pools of three. No eliminations took place in the third round. The top finishers in each pool were seeded into the championship bracket for first to fourth place. The second finishers competed in a bracket to determine fifth to eighth place, while the bottom teams competed in a bracket to determine ninth through twelfth place.

Pool O
In pool O, Italy moved on to the semifinal match, the USA advanced to the fifth to eighth bracket and France moved on to the ninth to twelfth place competition.

|}

|}

Pool P
Pool P saw Serbia advance to the semifinal. Russia advanced to the fifth to eighth bracket and Argentina to the ninth to twelfth place event.

|}

|}

Pool Q
In pool Q, Cuba advanced to the semifinal. Bulgaria moved on to the fifth to eighth place bracket and Spain to the ninth to twelfth.

|}

|}

Pool R
In pool R, Brazil advanced to the semifinal. Germany to the fifth to eighth bracket and the Czech Republic to the ninth to twelfth bracket.

|}

|}

Final round
All times are Central European Summer Time (UTC+02:00).

9th–12th places

9th–12th semifinals

|}

11th place match

|}

9th place match

|}

5th–8th places

5th–8th semifinals

|}

7th place match

|}

5th place match

|}

Final four

Semifinals

|}

3rd place match
In the bronze medal match, Serbia defeated hosts Italy, three sets to one. It was the country's first medal since they were runners-up in 1998 (then as Yugoslavia).

|}

Final
The final was a rematch of Brazil and Cuba, who had met earlier in the first round with Cuba winning 3 sets to 2 in an upset. The final was a different story however, with Brazil winning easily in straight sets 25–22, 25–14, 25–22; one Xinhua journalist called it a 'practice match' for Brazil. Brazil took advantage of a large number of Cuban mistakes, perhaps resulting from the young age of the Cuban team. Leandro Vissotto led Brazil in points with 19 and closed the match with a spike. The match was played before a crowd of 11,605 which included a number of Brazilian football stars based in Italy.

|}

Final standing

Awards

Most Valuable Player
 Murilo Endres
Best Scorer
 Ibán Pérez
Best Spiker
 Maxim Mikhaylov
Best Blocker
 Robertlandy Simón

Best Server
 Clayton Stanley
Best Setter
 Nikola Grbić
Best Libero
 Ferdinand Tille

Marketing

Symbol
Volly was the name chosen by Internet users and students of the 10 host cities of the World Championship (Ancona, Catania, Florence, Milan, Modena, Reggio Calabria, Rome, Turin, Trieste and Verona), after months of voting. The second most popular name for the mascot was "Fly," while "Mimmo," "Italo" and "Gump" finished further down the list.

Sponsors
Kinder Ferrero SpA
Mikasa
ICS
Lombardy
Milano
Asics
Fiat S.p.A.

Broadcasting

See also
2010 FIVB Women's World Championship

References

External links

Official website
Final Standing
Awards
Formula

 
VWCH 2010 Men
2010 FIVB Men's Volleyball World Championship
World Championship
FIVB Men's World Championship
V
September 2010 sports events in Italy
October 2010 sports events in Italy